Clarac may refer to the following places in France:

Clarac, Haute-Garonne, a commune in the Haute-Garonne department 
Clarac, Hautes-Pyrénées, a commune in the Hautes-Pyrénées department 
 , a former commune in the Pyrénées-Atlantiques department

See also 
 Charles Othon Frédéric Jean-Baptiste de Clarac (17771847), French artist, scholar and archaeologist
 Claracq, a commune in the Pyrénées-Atlantiques department in south-western France